Xian'an is a district of the city of Xianning, Hubei, People's Republic of China.

Xian'an District includes Xianning's central urban area (thus, it usually is not marked separately from Xianning on less detailed maps) and nearby villages.

Administration
Subdistricts:
Wenquan Subdistrict, Fushan Subdistrict, Yong'an Subdistrict

Towns:
Tingsiqiao, Xiangyanghu, Guanbuqiao, Heshengqiao, Shuangxiqiao, Maqiao, Guihua, Gaoqiao

The only township is Damu Township

Other Area: Xiangyanghu Dairy Farm

Transportation
 Wuhan–Xianning Intercity Railway (Xianning East and Xianning South stations)
 Beijing-Guangzhou Railway (Xianning Station)
 Wuhan–Guangzhou High-Speed Railway (Xianning North Railway Station)

Sights

References

County-level divisions of Hubei
Xianning